Terbium(III,IV) oxide, occasionally called tetraterbium heptaoxide, has the formula Tb4O7, though some texts refer to it as TbO1.75. There is some debate as to whether it is a discrete compound, or simply one phase in an interstitial oxide system. Tb4O7 is one of the main commercial terbium compounds, and the only such product containing at least some Tb(IV) (terbium in the +4 oxidation state), along with the more stable Tb(III). It is produced by heating the metal oxalate, and it is used in the preparation of other terbium compounds. Terbium forms three other major oxides: Tb2O3, TbO2, and Tb6O11.

Synthesis
Tb4O7 is most often produced by ignition of the oxalate at or the sulfate in air. The oxalate (at 1000 °C) is generally preferred, since the sulfate requires a higher temperature, and it produces an almost black product contaminated with Tb6O11 or other oxygen-rich oxides.

Chemical properties
Terbium(III,IV) oxide loses O2 when heated at high temperatures; at more moderate temperatures (ca. 350 °C) it reversibly loses oxygen, as shown by exchange with18O2. This property, also seen in Pr6O11 and V2O5, allows it to work like V2O5 as a redox catalyst in reactions involving oxygen. It was found as early as 1916 that hot Tb4O7 catalyses the reaction of coal gas (CO + H2) with air, leading to incandescence and often ignition.

Tb4O7 reacts with atomic oxygen to produce TbO2, but more convenient preparations are available.

 (s) + 6 HCl (aq) → 2  (s) + 2  (aq) + 3  (l)
.
Tb4O7 reacts with other hot concentrated acids to produce terbium(III) salts. For example, reaction with sulfuric acid gives terbium(III) sulfate. Terbium oxide reacts slowly with hydrochloric acid to form terbium(III) chloride solution, and elemental chlorine. At ambient temperature, complete dissolution might require a month; in a hot water bath, about a week.

Anhydrous terbium(III) chloride can be produced by the ammonium chloride route  In the first step, terbium oxide is heated with ammonium chloride to produce the ammonium salt of the pentachloride:
Tb4O7  +  22NH4Cl  →   4(NH4)2TbCl5  +  7H2O  +  14NH3
In the second step, the ammonium chloride salt is converted to the trichlorides by heating in a vacuum at 350-400 ºC:
(NH4)2TbCl5 →   TbCl3  +  2HCl  +  2NH3

References

Further reading

Terbium compounds
Mixed valence compounds
Oxides